Jazz & Bossa is a studio album by American jazz bassist Ron Carter released on July 15, 2008 via Blue Note label.

Track listing

Personnel
Ron Carter – bass, producer, composer (tracks 3 4 6 7 9)
Portinho – drums
Guilherme Monteiro – guitar
Rolando Morales-Matos – percussion 
Stephen Scott – piano
Javon Jackson – tenor saxophone

References 

Ron Carter albums
2008 albums
Blue Note Records albums